Ilmatar is Värttinä's 8th album, released in 2000.

The album is named for the Finnish goddess of air Ilmatar who, according to the creation story in the Kalevala, creates the world from two eggs from the eagle Kokko (which is also the name of an earlier Värttinä album). A version of this story (in English and Finnish) is printed in the liner notes of the United States release.

Track listing
"Itkin" (Pekka Lehti / Kirsi Kähkönen, Mari Kaasinen, traditional) – 5:20
"Käppee" (Kaasinen / Kaasinen, trad.) – 2:34
"Laiska" (Kari Reiman / Sirpa Reiman) – 4:06
"Liigua" (Susan Aho / Aho, trad.) – 5:08
"Milja" (K. Reiman / S. Reiman) – 4:27
"Äijö" (Antto Varilo / Kähkönen) – 4:22
"Kivutar" (K. Reiman / S. Reiman, K. Reiman, trad.) – 3:28
"Linnunmieli" (K. Reiman, trad. / S. Reiman, trad.) – 3:57
"Lieto" (K. Reiman) – 3:06
"Sanat" (Janne Lappalainen / Kähkönen) – 4:37
"Meri" (K. Reiman, S. Reiman, trad.) – 5:59

Personnel

Värttinä
Susan Aho – vocals
Mari Kaasinen – vocals
Kirsi Kähkönen – vocals
Riikka Väyrynen – vocals
Janne Lappalainen – bouzouki, soprano saxophone, kaval
Markku Lepistö – 5-row, 2-row and 1-row accordions, jouhikko
Pekka Lehti – double bass
Kari Reiman – fiddle
Marko Timonen – Galician bass drum, tama, surdo, shekere, klong yaw, bucket, broom, bells, percussion
Antto Varilo – 6 & 12 string guitars, cümbüş tanbur, 10-string kantele, vocals

Guests
Hughes de Courson – kantele cluster, piano wires
Gilles Chabenat – vielle à roue (1, 3, 9, 11)
Ismo Alanko – spell in 6
Nagy Lucina – lament in 11 (recorded 1959 in Hungary)

External links
Värttinä with lyrics, English translations and samples

Värttinä albums
2000 albums